Centennial College of Applied Arts and Technology is a diploma- and degree-granting college in Toronto, Ontario, Canada. It is the oldest publicly funded college in Ontario. Its campuses are situated on the east side of the city, particularly in Scarborough, with an aerospace centre at Downsview Park in North York.

Centennial College has been recognized as a culturally diverse post-secondary institution, almost 100 ethno-cultural groups are represented and 80 languages are spoken on campus. In 2016, it was ranked as one of Canada's Top 10 Research Colleges. Its main research facilities are its Wearable, Interactive and Mobile Technologies Access Centre in Healthcare (WIMTACH]), established in 2015 through a $1.75 million federal grant and its aerospace innovation hub, under construction at the former de Havilland plant in west-end Toronto.

Programs
Centennial offers more than 260 programs, including bachelor's degrees, diplomas, certificates, post-graduate certificates and apprenticeship programs, across many fields of study.

Founded in 1966, the college offers programs in business, communication arts, community and consumer services, applied computing, engineering technology, health sciences, animation, music, theatre, film and design. Centennial College supports enrolments of 22,000 full-time students and 19,000 part-time students.

History

Centennial College was the first community college to be opened in Ontario during the formation of the province's public college system in the 1960s.  Ontario Colleges of Applied Arts and Technology was established on May 21, 1965, under the direction of the Hon. William Davis, Minister of Education. The system has grown to encompass 24 public colleges serving 200 communities in the province.

As Centennial College's first site, Warden Woods Campus opened on October 17, 1966, with 514 students enrolled in 16 career-oriented programs, including journalism, secretarial science, and early childhood education. The campus used a decommissioned federal building that had been renovated to serve as a teaching institution. It evolved over the years to include the health/nutrition, hospitality, child studies, and community services programs. In 1973, the Ontario government transferred responsibility for nursing education from the province's hospitals to its colleges. Locally, the Scarborough Regional and the Toronto East General schools of nursing joined Centennial College to form the School of Health Sciences, based at Warden Woods Campus.

In 1992 the Scarborough Board of Education and the college established an adult education centre, the Scarborough Career Planning Centre, at the Centennial College. In 1994 the entities agreed to establish the centre there beginning in the fall of that year.

Centennial College grew rapidly, necessitating the establishment of additional campuses in the east end of Toronto to accommodate new programs and students. Warden Woods Campus closed in autumn of 2004 and was demolished to make way for a housing development. Most programs were relocated to the Centennial Science and Technology Centre (now Morningside Campus), which began operations the same year.

Campuses

Existing campuses are located at:

Morningside Campus
Located in Scarborough, Morningside Campus (previously Centennial College HP Science and Technology Centre) opened in the summer of 2004 to house joint programs with the nearby University of Toronto Scarborough.  The campus operates health science and environmental science programs, architectural technology, biotechnology, personal support worker, paramedics, pharmacy technology, environmental technology, massage therapy and others.

Progress Campus
Progress Campus in Scarborough is Centennial's largest campus. The programs offered there (located at 941 Progress Avenue, near Markham Road and Highway 401), are in computer science and technology, business, and hospitality and culinary arts. Students in the latter often work as hospitality staff/chefs in the student restaurant, The Local, or in the Student Centre kitchen run by the CCSAI. Progress Campus is the site of a Library and Academic Facility and an expanded Athletic and Wellness Centre, both of which opened in September 2011.

It's also home to the Centennial Event Centre, a multi-use venue for special events, corporate meetings and social functions. It is located on the top floor of the new Centennial student residence, which opened in August 2016, and replaced an older facility. The "A Block" (located on 939 Progress Avenue) of the campus was built in 1994 by the Scarborough Board of Education to house the students from Scarborough Centre for Alternative Studies adult secondary school.

Ashtonbee Campus
Located at 75 Ashtonbee Road in Scarborough, this campus houses the automotive services technician, career and college transition, motive power technician, auto body repair technician, general arts and science, and other programs. Ashtonbee Campus is regarded as one of the largest transportation technology training centers in North America.

In 2017, Ashtonbee Campus' library renovation project was one of 10 winners in the 2017 Ontario Association of Architects Awards Design Excellence division.

Story Arts Centre
Located near the Danforth at 951 Carlaw Avenue in East York, this campus opened in 1996 to house Centennial's award-winning School of Communications, Media, Arts and Design, a "premiere media and visual arts learning centre" in the region according to the East York Foundation. Taught here are most of the creative communication programs such as advertising and public relations, as well as professionally oriented programs in the arts, such as digital animation and game design.  The School of Communications, Media, Arts and Design also offers performance programs, including Theatre Arts and Performance, Music Industry Arts and Performance, Dance Performance and Performing Arts Fundamentals. The performance programs are housed in leased space at the Daniels Spectrum in downtown Toronto.

The building housing the Story Arts Centre was built to house the Toronto Teachers' College in 1955 and television buffs may know it as the location of the Canadian TV teen drama Degrassi High in the early 1990s. Since the closure of Toronto's francophone Collège des Grands-Lacs in 2002, Collège Boréal, a francophone college based primarily in Sudbury, also offered some French-language college programs at this facility until moving to its own new campus at One Yonge Street in 2012.

Downsview Aerospace Hub
In November 2016, work on the $72 million Downsview Park Aerospace Campus officially got underway with a groundbreaking ceremony attended by Ontario Premier Kathleen Wynne and federal Hon. Minister of Science Kirsty Duncan. With joint funding from the provincial and the federal government, the aerospace campus is being built on the site of the former de Havilland Aircraft Company Ltd. assembly plant in Downsview Park, Toronto. Centennial College is a partner in the Downsview aerospace consortium, DAIR, along with the University of Toronto, York University, Toronto Metropolitan University (formerly Ryerson University), and eight companies including Pratt and Whitney Canada, FlightSafety, Canadensys, UTC Aerospace, MDA, Safran Landing Systems, Honeywell and Bombardier Aerospace.

In May 2017, Centennial College received $2.3 million in funding from the Natural Sciences and Engineering Research Council of Canada (NSERC) to research electric landing gear for energy-efficient aircraft.

Suzhou Centennial College
In 2016, Suzhou Centennial College (SCC) officially launched. It is the first Canadian college approved by the Chinese government to deliver Canadian education in China. Suzhou Centennial College offers 18 programs, including four Centennial programs providing Canadian credentials in accounting, finance, software engineering and business foundations.

Warden Woods

Former campus(es) include:

Warden Woods Campus located at 651 Warden Avenue was formerly Canadian Arsenals Limited plant acquired in 1964. It closed in 2004 with site mostly demolished in 2005 and now a residential development. The historic Bell Estate c. 1830 has been preserved.

Residence, School of Hospitality, Tourism and Culinary Arts, and Event Centre
Responding to a critical shortage of affordable rental accommodations in Toronto at the time, Centennial College purchased the Howard Johnson Plaza Hotel Toronto East in June 2001 across the street from the Progress Campus and converted the hotel building into a college residence in time for the fall semester. The amenities and level of finish in the hotel building were considerably higher than that of many purpose-built college residences. Amenities included an indoor pool, glass elevator, four-storey atrium and warmly decorated rooms. The Centennial College Residence and Conference Centre was originally configured to accommodate 380 student residents, based on two students sharing a room, though later configurations allowed the creation of some single-occupancy rooms.

Rapid enrolment growth, fuelled by international students, compelled the college to examine building a new residence on the Progress Campus property. The resulting eight-storey quadrangle building was designed to house 740 students in two- and four-bed suites, complete with a bathroom and kitchen in every suite, with all residents having their own private bedroom. The new building is a hybrid: the ground floor is dedicated to Centennial's School of Hospitality, Tourism and Culinary Arts, complete with seven kitchen labs, eight classrooms and a restaurant and cafe (The Local) open to the public. The conference and events centre located on the top floor can accommodate up to 450 guests. Construction broke ground in October 2014 and the residence began occupancy in August 2016. Knightstone Capital Management provided the planning, financing and management of the project; other key partners include Diamond Schmitt Architects, Canadian Campus Communities and FRAM Building Group.

Academics
Centennial College offers full-time programs in more than 100 fields of study. These programs emphasize experiential learning with laboratory instruction, paid co-operative education opportunities, and industry and agency field placements. All Centennial programs are developed and kept current with the assistance of program advisory committees (PACs), made up of academic advisors and employer representatives. Their participation ensures the education and skills students receive at Centennial are up-to-date and relevant to the industry they are preparing to enter.

Centennial offers a variety of innovative degree programs. Five joint-degree programs in paramedicine, journalism, new media studies, environmental science & technology and applied microbiology are taught in conjunction with the University of Toronto Scarborough, and the Bachelor of Science Nursing program is delivered jointly with Ryerson University. Centennial was among the first colleges in Ontario to receive approval for applied-degree programs in computer and communication networking, and software systems: design, development and management.

Centennial College Schools
 School of Advancement
 The Business School
 School of Communications, Media Arts and Design
 School of Community and Health Studies
 School of Engineering, Technology and Applied Science
 School of Hospitality, Tourism and Culinary Arts
 School of Transportation

Community and special events
In July 2010, the students in the School of Hospitality, Tourism and Tourism participated and partnered for the very first time with North America's Largest Cultural Festival – Scotiabank Caribana (now formally called Scotiabank Caribbean Carnival Toronto (SBCCT)- Festival Management Committee and Tribal Knights with Dexter Senshuai created a Queen costume worn by Salome Odney a hospitality student under the theme "Tropical Amazon" which was presented at the Annual King and Queen Competition and then at the Annual Parade. This marked the 1st time an Ontario College took part in the festival which was a huge success in made local headlines and several pictures have surfaced. The student wearing the costume was interviewed by CP24 and various other television stations and media affiliates.

In July 2011, the students made a return to the Scotiabank Caribbean Carnival Festival and participated in highly King and Queen show under a new theme "LEGENDS" Our section that was chosen between the committee and Tribal Knights would fit the multicultural diversity of international Students from china and Japanese "Legends of Orient" This year would be a little different where it was opened up to the rest of the college staff, faculty, administration to participate with the Centennial College Student Association CCSAI. This year costume was worn by Annakay McCalla who wore the costume for the first time the Centennial College – School of Hospitality, Tourism and Culture to enter the competition at the Grand Parade and it will be judged with the mas band Tribal nights and made history that our costume was judged and received 4th place with Tribal Knights. The costume was interviewed by Rogers Cable, Global TV, Sway Magazine, CTV, WOW TV and others. There was large media coverage of the college participation this year by CTV/ CP24 on Parade Day on July 30 there were several pictures taken which are on Facebook, YouTube, Flicker,

In May 2012 – As a part of the partnership with Festival Management Committee management of Scotiabank Caribbean Carnival Toronto (SCCT) involved for the very 1st time took Centennial College students as part of their Internship/Co-OP from the hospitality, tourism and Culture program – Post Grad Festival Management Program students such as Fabia Morgan (Assistant Gala Coordinator/ Administrative Assistant), plus the Business Administration program Shemmie Bayne (Administrative Assistant to Festival Administrator) and from Festival and Events Management Class/Hotel and Resort Management Program, Steven McKinnon (Office Assistant & Marketplace Coordinator)

In April 2017, Centennial College's "Paint the Town Green" celebration won the "Best Event Produced for a Corporation by an In-house Team" award at the Canadian Event Industry Awards Gala, held in Vaughan, Ontario. Thousands of volunteers went to 11 major cities of Toronto and planted trees, spread mulch, and removed trash from waterways and nature trails.

Notable alumni and faculty

 Diana Cabrera, sports shooter
 John Candy, comedy actor
 Elinor Caplan, businesswoman and politician
 Diana Capponi, mental health activist
 John Cooper, author and corporate communication specialist
 Jeff Chapman (Ninjalicious), urban explorer and writer
 Eric Bauza, voice actor and comedian
 John Child, Olympic athlete
 Joe Daniel, politician
 Jeffrey Dvorkin, journalist
 Tobias Enverga, Canadian senator
 Mario Ferri, municipal councillor of Vaughan
 Robert Fisher, journalist
 John Gray, politician
 Murtz Jaffer, celebrity journalist
 Michaele Jordana, musician
 Arin King, footballer
 Ashley Diana Morris, model and actress
 Nailah Rowe, footballer
 Saurabh Sharma, sports personality and businessman
 Gabriella Sundar Singh, actress
 Fred Stone, music educator
 Jennifer Valentyne, television personality
 Andes Yue, television presenter
 Kamaj Silva, businessman

See also
 Higher education in Ontario
 List of colleges in Ontario

References

External links

 

 
Educational institutions established in 1965
Colleges in Ontario
1965 establishments in Ontario
Canadian Centennial